The S.D. Merritt House is a historic house at 45 Arkansas Highway 25 North in Greenbrier, Arkansas.  It is a single story masonry structure, its exterior clad in a distinctive combination of fieldstone laid in herringbone patterns, and cream-colored brick trim.  It was designed by Silas Owens, Sr., a prominent regional African-American mason, and built c. 1950 by Owens and his son, Silas Jr.   It is a basically L-shaped structure, with a covered carport at the left end, and a forward-projecting section on the right.

The house was listed on the National Register of Historic Places in 2005.

See also
National Register of Historic Places listings in Faulkner County, Arkansas

References

Houses on the National Register of Historic Places in Arkansas
Houses completed in 1950
Houses in Faulkner County, Arkansas